Mordellistena luteipalpis is a beetle in the genus Mordellistena of the family Mordellidae. It was described in 1895 by Friedrich Julius Schilsky.

References

luteipalpis
Beetles described in 1895